The Rennell Islands are two islands in the Queen Adelaide Archipelago in Magallanes y la Antártica Chilena Region, Chile.  The larger island, South Rennell Island, has an area of 340 km2.  The smaller island, North Rennell Island, has an area of 303 km2.

Google Earth shows the passage between the "two" islands to be blocked by a strip of land 30 metres wide. S51 57 40 W74 05 49. The islands are connected. (edited 18 Feb 2012)

Queen Adelaide Archipelago
Islands of Magallanes Region